Klein Glacier is a broad glacier near the edge of the Antarctic polar plateau, flowing northwest into Scott Glacier immediately south of the La Gorce Mountains. It was mapped by the United States Geological Survey from surveys and U.S. Navy air photos, 1960–63, and was named by the Advisory Committee on Antarctic Names for Lieutenant Commander Verle W. Klein, a pilot with U.S. Navy Squadron VX-6 on Operation Deep Freeze, 1966 and 1967.

References

Glaciers of Marie Byrd Land